CS Concordia Chiajna was a Romanian professional basketball club, based in Chiajna, Romania. The club was founded in 1957 and dissolved in 2013.

References

Chiajna
Sport in Ilfov County
Defunct basketball teams in Romania
1957 establishments in Romania
2013 disestablishments in Romania
Basketball teams established in 1957
Basketball teams disestablished in 2013